The BAFTA Award for Outstanding British Film is given annually by the British Academy of Film and Television Arts presented at the British Academy Film Awards. The award was first given at the 1st British Academy Film Awards, first recognising the films of 1947, and lasted until 1968. For over two decades a specific category for British cinema did not exist, until it was revived at the 46th British Academy Film Awards, recognising the films of 1992. It was previously known as the Alexander Korda Award for Best British Film; while still given in honour of Korda, the award is now called "Outstanding British Film" and recognises "outstanding and original British filmmaking which shows exceptional creativity and innovation."

To be eligible for nomination as Outstanding British Film, a film "must have significant creative involvement by individuals who are British", including those who have been permanently resident in the UK for ten years or more. The candidates for nomination are the film's director(s), writer(s), and up to three producers; if none of these are British, the film will only be eligible in exceptional circumstances.

In the following lists, the titles and names in bold with a dark grey background are the winners and recipients respectively; those not in bold are the nominees. The years given are those in which the films under consideration were released, not the year of the ceremony, which always takes place the following year.

Winners and nominees

1940s

1950s
{| class="wikitable" style="width:95%;" cellpadding="5"
|-
! style="width:5%;"| Year
! style="width:20%;"| Film
! style="width:20%;"| Director(s)
! style="width:30%;"| Producer(s)
|-
| rowspan="6" style="text-align:center" |1950(4th)
| style="background:#ccc;"|The Blue Lamp || style="background:#ccc;"| Basil Dearden || style="background:#ccc;"|Michael Balcon
|-
|Chance of a Lifetime || Bernard Miles || Bernard Miles
|-
|Morning Departure || Roy Ward Baker || Jay Lewis
|-
|Seven Days to Noon || John Boulting, Roy Boulting || John Boulting, Roy Boulting
|-
|State Secret || Sidney Gilliat || Sidney Gilliat, Frank Launder
|-
|The Wooden Horse || Jack Lee || Ian Dalrymple
|-
| rowspan="8" style="text-align:center" |1951(5th)
| style="background:#ccc;"| The Lavender Hill Mob || style="background:#ccc;"| Charles Crichton || style="background:#ccc;"|Michael Balcon
|-
|The Browning Version || Anthony Asquith || Teddy Baird
|-
|The Magic Box || John Boulting || Ronald Neame
|-
|The Magic Garden || Donald Swanson || Donald Swanson
|-
|The Man in the White Suit|| Alexander Mackendrick || Michael Balcon
|-
|No Resting Place || Paul Rotha || Colin Lesslie
|-
|The Small Miracle || Maurice Cloche, Ralph Smart || Anthony Havelock-Allan
|-
|White Corridors|| Pat Jackson || John Croydon, Joseph Janni
|-
| rowspan="6" style="text-align:center" |1952(6th)
| style="background:#ccc;"| The Sound Barrier || style="background:#ccc;"| David Lean || style="background:#ccc;"|David Lean
|-
|Angels One Five || George More O'Ferrall || John W. Gossage  Derek N. Twist
|-
|Cry, the Beloved Country || Zoltán Korda || Zoltán Korda, Alan Paton
|-
|Mandy || Alexander Mackendrick, Fred F. Sears || Michael Balcon, Leslie Norman
|-
|Outcast of the Islands || Carol Reed || Carol Reed
|-
|The River || Jean Renoir || Kenneth McEldowney, Jean Renoir
|-
| rowspan="5" style="text-align:center" |1953(7th)
| style="background:#ccc;"| Genevieve || style="background:#ccc;"| Henry Cornelius || style="background:#ccc;"|Henry Cornelius
|-
|The Cruel Sea || Charles Frend || Leslie Norman
|-
|The Heart of the Matter || George More O'Ferrall || Ian Dalrymple
|-
|The Kidnappers || Philip Leacock || Sergei Nolbandov, Leslie Parkyn
|-
|Moulin Rouge || John Huston || John and James Woolf
|-
| rowspan="8" style="text-align:center" |1954(8th)
| style="background:#ccc;"|Hobson's Choice || style="background:#ccc;"|David Lean || style="background:#ccc;"|David Lean
|-
|Carrington V.C. || Anthony Asquith || Teddy Baird
|-
|The Divided Heart || Charles Crichton || Michael Truman
|-
|Doctor in the House|| Ralph Thomas || Betty E. Box
|-
|For Better, for Worse || J. Lee Thompson || Kenneth Harper
|-
|The Maggie|| Alexander Mackendrick || Michael Truman
|-
|The Purple Plain || Robert Parrish || John Bryan
|-
|Romeo and Juliet || Renato Castellani || Sandro Ghenzi, Joseph Janni
|-
| rowspan="7" style="text-align:center" |1955(9th)
| style="background:#ccc;"| Richard III || style="background:#ccc;"| Laurence Olivier || style="background:#ccc;"|Laurence Olivier
|-
|The Colditz Story || Guy Hamilton || Ivan Foxwell
|-
|The Dam Busters|| Michael Anderson || Robert Clark, W. A. Whittaker
|-
|The Ladykillers || Alexander Mackendrick || Seth Holt, Michael Balcon
|-
|The Night My Number Came Up || Leslie Norman || Michael Balcon
|-
|The Prisoner || Peter Glenville || Vivian Cox
|-
|Simba || Brian Desmond Hurst || Peter De Sarigny
|-
| rowspan="5" style="text-align:center" |1956(10th)
| style="background:#ccc;"|Reach for the Sky || style="background:#ccc;"| Lewis Gilbert || style="background:#ccc;"|Daniel M. Angel
|-
|The Battle of the River Plate || Michael Powell, Emeric Pressburger || Michael Powell, Emeric Pressburger
|-
|The Man Who Never Was || Ronald Neame || André Hakim
|-
|A Town Like Alice || Jack Lee || Joseph Janni
|-
|Yield to the Night || J. Lee Thompson || Kenneth Harper
|-
| rowspan="4" style="text-align:center" |1957(11th)
| style="background:#ccc;"|The Bridge on the River Kwai || style="background:#ccc;"| David Lean || style="background:#ccc;"|Sam Spiegel
|-
|The Prince and the Showgirl|| Laurence Olivier || Laurence Olivier
|-
|The Shiralee || Leslie Norman || Michael Balcon, Jack Rix
|-
|Windom's Way || Ronald Neame || John Bryan
|-
| rowspan="5" style="text-align:center" |1958(12th)
| style="background:#ccc;"|Room at the Top || style="background:#ccc;"| Jack Clayton || style="background:#ccc;"|James Woolf, John Woolf
|-
|Ice Cold in Alex|| J. Lee Thompson || W. A. Whittaker
|-
|Indiscreet || Stanley Donen || Stanley Donen
|-
|Orders to Kill || Anthony Asquith || Anthony Havelock-Allan
|-
|Sea of Sand|| Guy Green || Robert S. Baker, Monty Berman
|-
| rowspan="5" style="text-align:center" |1959(13th)
| style="background:#ccc;"| Sapphire || style="background:#ccc;"| Basil Dearden || style="background:#ccc;"|Michael Relph
|-
|Look Back in Anger || Tony Richardson || Harry Saltzman
|-
|North West Frontier || rowspan="2" | J. Lee Thompson || Marcel Hellman
|-
|Tiger Bay || John Hawkesworth, Leslie Parkyn, Julian Wintle
|-
|Yesterday's Enemy|| Val Guest || Michael Carreras
|-
|}

1960s
{| class="wikitable" style="width:95%;" cellpadding="5"
|-
! style="width:5%;"| Year
! style="width:20%;"| Film
! style="width:20%;"| Director(s)
! style="width:30%;"| Producer(s)
|-
| rowspan="4" style="text-align:center" |1960(14th)
| style="background:#ccc;"| Saturday Night and Sunday Morning || style="background:#ccc;"| Karel Reisz || style="background:#ccc;"|Tony Richardson
|-
|The Angry Silence || Guy Green || Richard Attenborough, Bryan Forbes
|-
|The Trials of Oscar Wilde || Ken Hughes || Irving Allen, Albert R. Broccoli, Harold Huth
|-
|Tunes of Glory|| Ronald Neame || Colin Lesslie
|-
| rowspan="5" style="text-align:center" |1961(15th)
| style="background:#ccc;"| A Taste of Honey || style="background:#ccc;"| Tony Richardson || style="background:#ccc;"| Tony Richardson
|-
|The Innocents || Jack Clayton || Jack Clayton
|-
|The Long and the Short and the Tall || Leslie Norman || Michael Balcon
|-
|The Sundowners || Fred Zinnemann || Gerry Blattner
|-
|Whistle Down the Wind || Bryan Forbes || Richard Attenborough
|-
| rowspan="5" style="text-align:center" |1962(16th)
| style="background:#ccc;"| Lawrence of Arabia || style="background:#ccc;"| David Lean || style="background:#ccc;"|Sam Spiegel
|-
|Billy Budd || Peter Ustinov || Peter Ustinov
|-
|A Kind of Loving || John Schlesinger || Joseph Janni
|-
|The L-Shaped Room || Bryan Forbes || Richard Attenborough, James Woolf
|-
|Only Two Can Play || Sidney Gilliat || Leslie Gilliat
|-
| rowspan="4" style="text-align:center" |1963(17th)
| style="background:#ccc;"| Tom Jones || style="background:#ccc;"| Tony Richardson || style="background:#ccc;"|Tony Richardson
|-
|Billy Liar || John Schlesinger || Joseph Janni
|-
|The Servant|| Joseph Losey || Joseph Losey, Norman Priggen
|-
|This Sporting Life || Lindsay Anderson || Karel Reisz
|-
| rowspan="4" style="text-align:center" |1964(18th)
| style="background:#ccc;"| Dr. Strangelove or: How I Learned to Stop Worrying and Love the Bomb || style="background:#ccc;"| Stanley Kubrick || style="background:#ccc;"|Stanley Kubrick
|-
| Becket || Peter Glenville || Hal B. Wallis
|-
|The Pumpkin Eater || Jack Clayton || James Woolf
|-
|The Train || John Frankenheimer || Jules Bricken
|-
| rowspan="4" style="text-align:center" |1965(19th)
| style="background:#ccc;"| The IPCRESS File || style="background:#ccc;"| Sidney J. Furie || style="background:#ccc;"|Harry Saltzman|-
| Darling || John Schlesinger || Joseph Janni
|-
|The Hill || Sidney Lumet || Kenneth Hyman
|-
|The Knack ...and How to Get It || Richard Lester || Oscar Lewenstein
|-
| rowspan="4" style="text-align:center" |1966(20th)
| style="background:#ccc;"| The Spy Who Came in from the Cold || style="background:#ccc;"| Martin Ritt || style="background:#ccc;"|Martin Ritt|-
| Alfie || Lewis Gilbert || Lewis Gilbert
|-
|Georgy Girl || Silvio Narizzano || Robert A. Goldston, Otto Plaschkes
|-
|Morgan – A Suitable Case for Treatment || Karel Reisz || Leon Clore
|-
| rowspan="4" style="text-align:center" |1967(21st)
| style="background:#ccc;"| A Man For All Seasons || style="background:#ccc;"| Fred Zinnemann || style="background:#ccc;"|Fred Zinnemann'|-
| Accident || Joseph Losey || Joseph Losey, Norman Priggen
|-
|Blow-Up || Michelangelo Antonioni || Carlo Ponti
|-
|The Deadly Affair || Sidney Lumet || Sidney Lumet
|-
|}

1990s

2000s

2010s

2020s

Multiple wins and nominationsFrom 1992 onwards''

Multiple wins

Notes

References

External links
 BAFTA Awards at Internet Movie Database
 Awards at BAFTA

British Academy Film Awards
Lists of films by award
Awards for best film
BAFTA winners (films)